A list of cinder cones is shown below.

Africa

Democratic Republic of the Congo
Volcan mmRumoka
Morean Volcano
Mt. Rukinear
Mt. Mehdk
Mt. Myra

Asia

Japan
Mount Suribachi, Iwo Jima
Mount Ōmuro, Izu-Tobu, Honshu
, Aso volcano, Kyushu

Philippines

 Smith Volcano
 Taal Volcano
 Mount Mayabobo
 Musuan Volcano

Russia
Balagan-Tas, Sakha Republic
Kostakan, Kamchatka Peninsula
Ivao Group, Urup Island, Kuril Islands
Lomonosov Group, Paramushir Island, Kuril Islands
Vernadskii Ridge, Paramushir Island, Kuril Islands
Tolmachev Dol, Kamchatka

Turkey
Kula
Karapınar

Europe

France
Puy de Pariou, Auvergne
Puy de Côme, Auvergne
Puy de la Vache, Auvergne
Puy de Lassolas, Auvergne
Puy des Goules, Auvergne
Grand Sarcoui, Auvergne
Puys Chopine et des Gouttes, Auvergne
All situated in the Chaîne des Puys volcanic field.

Iceland
Hverfjall, Mývatn

Italy
Monte Nuovo, Italy

North America

Canada

Tseax Cone, British Columbia
Volcano Mountain, Yukon
Atlin Volcanic Field, British Columbia
Buck Hill, British Columbia
Cache Hill, British Columbia
Dragon Cone, British Columbia
Eve Cone, British Columbia
Ibex Mountain, Yukon
Iskut-Unuk River Cones, British Columbia
Itcha Range, British Columbia
Kana Cone, British Columbia
Kostal Cone, British Columbia
Nazko Cone, British Columbia
Opal Cone, Garibaldi Park, British Columbia
Alligator Lake volcanic complex, Yukon
Big Timothy Mountain, British Columbia
Camp Hill, British Columbia
Cinder Cliff, British Columbia
Cinder Cone, British Columbia
Cinder Mountain, British Columbia
Cocoa Crater, British Columbia
Coffee Crater, British Columbia
Cracker Creek Cone, British Columbia
Kitasu Hill, British Columbia
Machmel River Cone, British Columbia
Moraine Cone, British Columbia
Nahta Cone, British Columbia
Pointed Stick Cone, British Columbia
Ne Ch'e Ddhawa, Yukon
Ridge Cone, British Columbia
Flourmill Cone, British Columbia
Gabrielse Cone, British Columbia
Satah Mountain, British Columbia
The Saucer, British Columbia
Sidas Cone, British Columbia
Sleet Cone, British Columbia
Storm Cone, British Columbia
Triplex Cone, British Columbia
Twin Cone, British Columbia
Volcanic Creek Cone, British Columbia
Williams Cone, British Columbia

Mexico

El Jorullo
Parícutin, Mexico
Pinacate Peaks, Mexico

United States

Craters of the Moon National Monument and Preserve, Idaho
Cinder Cone and the Fantastic Lava Beds, California
Mono-Inyo Craters, California
Pisgah Crater, California
Cinnamon Butte, Oregon
Davis Lake volcanic field, Oregon
Newberry Volcano, Oregon
Amboy Crater, California
Schonchin Butte, California
Twin Buttes, California
Capulin Volcano National Monument, northeastern New Mexico
Albuquerque volcanic field, Albuquerque, New Mexico
Zuni-Bandera volcanic field, Grants, New Mexico
Mount Gordon, Alaska
Ingakslugwat Hills, Alaska
Hoodoo Butte, Oregon
Indian Heaven, Washington
Lava Butte, Oregon
Mount Talbert, Oregon
Pilot Butte, Oregon
Powell Butte, Oregon
Rocky Butte, Oregon
Mount Tabor, Oregon
Wizard Island, Oregon
Prindle Volcano, Alaska
 Veyo Volcano in Veyo, Utah
Roden Crater, Arizona
S P Crater, Arizona
Sunset Crater, Arizona
Vulcan's Throne, Arizona
Tantalus, Hawaii
Puʻu ʻŌʻō, Hawaii
 Puʻu Waʻawaʻa Hawaii
Koko Crater, Hawaii

Oceania

Australia
Mount Leura, Victoria
Mount Fox, Queensland
Mount Elephant, Victoria

New Zealand
Maungakiekie / One Tree Hill
Maungawhau / Mount Eden
Maungarei / Mount Wellington
Mount Tongariro

South America

Peru
 Central Volcanic Zone
 Andagua volcanic field
 Cerro Nicholson

Chile
Central Volcanic Zone
El Rojo Norte
El Rojo Sur
Austral Volcanic Zone:
Pali-Aike Volcanic Field
Southern Volcanic Zone:
Anticura Group
Fui Group
Caburgua-Huelemolle
Puyuhuapi
Pichi-Golgol Group
Carrán-Los Venados, Chile
Mirador
Los Venados Group
Easter Island
Puna Pau

Other

Royal Society Volcano, Antarctica
Cerro Volcánico, Argentina
Mount Mayabobo, Philippines
Bombalai Hill (Sabah, Malaysia)
Geghama mountains, Armenia
Chaîne des Puys, France (a chain of volcanoes including cinder cones)
Vulcan, Papua New Guinea
Manda-Inakir, Ethiopia-Djibouti border
Barren Island, Andaman Islands
Teneguía, Canary Islands
Cerro Negro, Nicaragua
 San Salvador, El Salvador

See also
 List of lava domes
 List of shield volcanoes
 List of stratovolcanoes
 List of subglacial volcanoes
 Lists of volcanoes

References

 Cinder cones